The Michael Billmeyer House, aka the Bensell-Billmeyer House, is a historic twin house in the Mount Airy section of Philadelphia, Pennsylvania. It was built around 1730 by John George Bensell. Michael Billmeyer, the noted printer of Germantown, purchased it in 1789. It is said that from this point, General George Washington directed the Continental forces in the Battle of Germantown against the British stronghold at Cliveden.

The house was added to the National Register of Historic Places in 1972. It is a contributing property of the Colonial Germantown Historic District. The Daniel Billmeyer House, located across the street, was built by Michael for his son in 1793 and is also listed on the NRHP.

References

Houses completed in 1730
Houses on the National Register of Historic Places in Philadelphia
Historic district contributing properties in Pennsylvania
Mount Airy, Philadelphia
1730 establishments in Pennsylvania